The 2011 Dominion Curling Club Championship was held from November 21 to 26 at the Richmond Curling Club in Richmond, British Columbia. The third edition of the Dominion Curling Club Championship featured men's and women's teams from clubs all across Canada.

Women

Teams

Round-robin standings
Final round-robin standings

Round-robin results

Draw 2
Tuesday, November 22, 1:30 pm

 and  receive byes this round.

Draw 4
Tuesday, November 22, 8:15 pm

 and  receive byes this round.

Draw 5
Wednesday, November 23, 10:00 am

 and  receive byes this round.

Draw 7
Wednesday, November 23, 4:45 pm

 and  receive byes this round.

Draw 10
Thursday, November 24, 1:30 pm

 and  receive byes this round.

Draw 12
Thursday, November 24, 8:00 pm

 and  receive byes this round.

Draw 13
Friday, November 25, 9:00 am

 and  receive byes this round.

Tiebreaker
Friday, November 25, 8:00 pm

Playoffs

Semifinals
Saturday, November 26, 9:00 am

Final
Saturday, November 26, 2:00 pm

Men

Teams

*Jean Arsenault replaced Rémi Dutil, who couldn't attend the championship. In the provincial, Dutil played at third, throwing skip stones.

Round-robin standings
Final round-robin standings

Round-robin results

Draw 1
Tuesday, November 22, 10:00 am

 and  receive byes this round.

Draw 3
Tuesday, November 22, 4:45 pm

 and  receive byes this round.

Draw 6
Wednesday, November 23, 1:30 pm

 and  receive byes this round.

Draw 8
Wednesday, November 23, 8:00 pm

 and  receive byes this round.

Draw 9
Thursday, November 24, 10:00 am

 and  receive byes this round.

Draw 11
Thursday, November 24, 4:45 pm

 and  receive byes this round.

Draw 14
Friday, November 25, 12:30 pm

 and  receive byes this round.

Tiebreaker
Friday, November 25, 8:00 pm

Playoffs

Semifinals
Saturday, November 26, 9:00 am

Final
Saturday, November 26, 2:00 pm

External links
Official site
2011 Event Home
Draw Schedule

Canadian Curling Club Championships
The Dominion Curling Club Championship
Richmond, British Columbia
Curling in British Columbia
2011 in British Columbia
November 2011 sports events in Canada